Strawberry Shortcake in Big Apple City is a 1981 animated television special written by Romeo Muller, produced by Muller and Buzz Potamkin, and directed by Hal Silvermintz. This is the second special to feature the American Greetings character Strawberry Shortcake.

Synopsis
Strawberry Shortcake in Big Apple City chronicles Strawberry Shortcake's trip to Big Apple City (an obvious parallel to New York City, also known as the "Big Apple"), so she can compete in a baking contest at "the little theater off Times Pear" (referencing Times Square). Strawberry's journey, however, is in jeopardy due to the constant interference of Purple Pieman, who is her only competition in the bake-off. The Pieman counts on his kohlrabi cookies and a little trickery to beat Strawberry and her famous shortcake. A "Spinach Village" is also mentioned, a reference to Greenwich Village.

Cast

Release
Strawberry Shortcake in Big Apple City was the second television special sponsored by the Kenner toy company, then owned by General Mills.  The special marked the debut of characters such as T.N. Honey, Lemon Meringue and Horse Radish. It premiered on April 10, 1981, on 101 U.S. stations, among them WPIX in New York City, WKBS-TV in Philadelphia, WFLD in Chicago and KTLA in Los Angeles.

See also
 List of 1980s Strawberry Shortcake specials

References

External links
 
 Bit the Dust Tape - QuickTime files of the first five specials

1981 television films
1981 films
Animated television specials
1980s American animated films
Strawberry Shortcake films
First-run syndicated television programs in the United States
American television films
New York City in fiction
Television shows written by Romeo Muller